Michele Imperiali Simeana, Prince of Montena and Francavilla (before 1736–1782) was a Spanish grandee and collector of classical sculpture, who also acted as major domo to the King of Naples and was a Knight of the Golden Fleece from 1770 onwards.  He belonged to the Imperiali family.

Biography
His collection included the Piranesi Vase.  He became friends with Casanova in 1770, who visited his home, the Palazzo Cellammare in Naples. His picture collection was estimated at 30,000 ducats, containing works by Titian and Paul Veronese. The terraced gardens were considered to be among the finest in Naples.

References

1736 births
1782 deaths
18th-century Neapolitan people
People from Francavilla Fontana
Year of birth uncertain
Knights of the Golden Fleece of Spain
Imperiali family